The Medicine Hat Blue Jays were a Rookie League affiliate of the  Toronto Blue Jays, playing in the Pioneer League and located in the city of Medicine Hat, Alberta, Canada. They played a total of 25 seasons; 1978 through 2002. Their home field was Athletic Park.

History
Over the years, the Medicine Hat club generally struggled on the field and with attendance, but the Jays did have some noteworthy seasons.  In 1982, they captured their only championship.  They reached the championship series again in 1995 but lost the title to the Helena Brewers.  The Blue Jays only reached the playoffs one other time, losing to the Great Falls Dodgers in 2000.

The team arrived in Medicine Hat in 1977, playing as the Medicine Hat A's, affiliated with the Oakland A's. The team had relocated from Boise, Idaho, where they had played two seasons as the Boise A's in the Northwest League. After the 2002 season, Toronto ended their affiliation with the club (switching to the Pulaski Blue Jays), and the Pioneer League left Medicine Hat. The Blue Jays relocated to Montana and became the second incarnation of the Helena Brewers.

Notable alumni 
Over the years, some of the most notable players to wear a Medicine Hat uniform included:

 Chris Carpenter 
 David Wells
 Lloyd Moseby
 Fred Manrique
 John Cerutti
 Gustavo Chacín
 Randy Knorr
 Jimmy Key
 Pat Borders
 Mark Eichhorn
 Mike Timlin

 Jay Gibbons (won the league's Triple Crown in 1998)
 Greg Morrison (won the league's Triple Crown in 1997)

See also
 Medicine Hat Blue Jays players

Notes

References

External links 
baseball-reference.com – Medicine Hat minor league teams
 Medicine Hat Blue Jays
 Pioneer League baseball

Baseball teams in Alberta
Defunct baseball teams in Canada
Defunct Pioneer League (baseball) teams
Sport in Medicine Hat
Toronto Blue Jays minor league affiliates